Ernest Ruthven Sykes (1867-1954) was a malacologist from Great Britain.

He married Gladys, who was a daughter of his malacological colleague James Cosmo Melvill.

He published 99 malacological articles.

References

External links 
 

1867 births
1954 deaths
British malacologists